Joppa is an unincorporated community in Guilford Township, Hendricks County, Indiana.

History
A post office was established at Joppa in 1880, and remained in operation until it was discontinued in 1903. The community was named after Joppa, or Jaffa, in Israel.

Geography

References

Unincorporated communities in Hendricks County, Indiana
Unincorporated communities in Indiana
Indianapolis metropolitan area